Palm is an unincorporated community in Montgomery County, Pennsylvania, United States.  It lies along Pennsylvania Route 29 between Hereford and East Greenville at latitude 40.4281539 longitude −75.5329608. It is located in Upper Hanover Township and the ZIP code is 18070. The Hosensack Creek flows from the northeast into the Perkiomen Creek and forms the natural southern boundary of the village. The area south of the Hosensack Creek is served by the East Greenville post office with the ZIP of 18041.

Palm is the site of one of the five remaining Schwenkfelder Churches in the United States. It is also the birthplace of science fiction writer, publisher and minister Lloyd Arthur Eshbach.

Gallery

References 

Unincorporated communities in Montgomery County, Pennsylvania
Unincorporated communities in Pennsylvania